Gaildorf is a town in the district of Schwäbisch Hall, in Baden-Württemberg, Germany. It is located on the river Kocher, 13 km south of Schwäbisch Hall. Gaildorf is the approximate center of the Limpurger Land district, formerly a county of the Holy Roman Empire ruled by the counts Schenk von Limpurg until their extinction in 1713, thereafter inherited by a number of female heirs, and mediatized to the Kingdom of Württemberg in 1806.

Notable people

 (1806–1883), member of Landtag
 (1700-1783), organ-maker
 (1807–1857), Württembergian city councilman
 (1817–1907), doctor and poet (son of Justinus Kerner)
 (1824–1895), merchant and member of landtag
 (1835–1914), prime minister of Württemberg
 (1839–1892), Schultheiß and politician
 (1847–1928), pharmacist and fossil-collector in Crailsheim
 (born 1926), agriculturalist
 (1936–2009), writer
 (born 1959), composer
 (born 1969), politician (CDU)
Hermann Frasch (1851–1914), mining engineer

References

Schwäbisch Hall (district)
Municipalities in Baden-Württemberg